Paolo Costella (born 19 February 1964) is an Italian screenwriter and film director. He contributed to more than sixteen films since 1987.

Selected filmography

References

External links 

1964 births
Living people
Italian film directors
Italian screenwriters
Italian male screenwriters